Simić is a Serbo-Croatian surname derived from the male given name Simo (a diminutive), found mainly among ethnic Serbs, but also Croats. It may refer to:

 Aleksa Simić (1800-1872), three-time prime minister
 Aleksandar Simić (born 1973), Serbian composer
 Blagoje Simić (born 1960), Bosnian Serb war criminal
 Charles Simic (born 1938), Serbian-American poet
 Goran Simić (born 1952), Bosnian poet
 Goran Simić (1953–2008), Serbian singer
 Jelena Simić (born 1992), Bosnian tennis player
 Jovan Simić Bobovac (1775-1831), Serbian prince
 Ljubiša Simić (born 1963), Serbian boxer
 Marko Simić (born 1987), Serbian-born Montenegrin football player
 Milorad Simić (born 1946), Bosnian-born Serbian linguist
 Valentina Simić (born 1994), Serbian dancer, hula-hooper, poet and writer - creator of Panda Time
 Vasilije Simić (1866-1931), Serbian lawyer, judge and attorney

See also 
 Simović
 Šimić

Serbian surnames
Croatian surnames
Patronymic surnames
Surnames from given names